Pedro Rafael Marin (born March 30, 1958) is an American politician. He is a member of the Georgia House of Representatives, serving since 2003. He is a member of the Democratic party.

References

External links

Democratic Party members of the Georgia House of Representatives
21st-century American politicians
Living people
People from Duluth, Georgia
2020 United States presidential electors
1958 births